This page provides the summaries of the AFC first round matches for 2014 FIFA World Cup qualification.

Format
In this round the sixteen lowest seeded teams were drawn into 8 home-and-away ties.  The draw took place on 30 March 2011 at AFC House in Kuala Lumpur, Malaysia.

The matches were held prior to the main draw for the 2014 FIFA World Cup, with first legs on 29 June 2011 and second legs on 2 and 3 July. The 8 winners advanced to the second round of the Asian qualifiers.

Seeding
Teams were seeded into two pots – Pot 1 included teams ranked 28–35 and Pot 2 teams ranked 36–43.

Results

|}

4–4 on aggregate. Malaysia won on the away goals rule and advanced to the second round against Singapore.

Bangladesh won 3–0 on aggregate and advanced to the second round against Lebanon.

Laos won 8–6 on aggregate after extra time and advanced to the second round against China.

Philippines won 5–1 on aggregate and advanced to the second round against Kuwait.

Palestine won 3–1 on aggregate and advanced to the second round against Thailand.

Vietnam won 13–1 on aggregate and advanced to the second round against Qatar.

Nepal won 7–1 on aggregate and advanced to the second round against Jordan.

Myanmar won 2–1 on aggregate and advanced to the second round against Oman.

Goalscorers
There were 60 goals scored in 16 games, for an average of 3.75 goals per game.

7 goals
 Lê Công Vinh

2 goals

 Sam El Nasa
 Kouch Sokumpheak
 Chen Po-liang
 Manolom Phomsouvanh
 Lamnao Singto
 Aidil Zafuan
 Safiq Rahim
 Anil Gurung
 Ju Manu Rai
 Phil Younghusband
 Huỳnh Quang Thanh

1 goal

 Balal Arezou
 Jahid Hasan Ameli
 Mohamed Zahid Hossain
 Rezaul Karim
 Chhin Chhoeun
 Khoun Laboravy
 Chang Han
 Xavier Chen
 Visay Phaphouvanin
 Khampheng Sayavutthi
 Souliya Syphasay
 Kanlaya Sysomvang
 Leong Ka Hang
 Khürelbaataryn Tsend-Ayuush
 Mai Aih Naing
 Pai Soe
 Jagajeet Shrestha
 Sujal Shrestha
 Bhola Silwal
 Murad Alyan
 Ismail Al-Amour
 Houssam Wadi
 Nate Burkey
 Emelio Caligdong
 Ángel Guirado
 Chathura Gunaratne
 João Kik
 Nguyễn Ngọc Thanh
 Nguyễn Quang Hải
 Nguyễn Văn Quyết
 Phạm Thành Lương

Notes

References

External links
Results and schedule (FIFA.com version)
Results and schedule (the-AFC.com version)

1
Qual